Ceratospermopsis is a genus of fungi in the family Meliolaceae. It was circumscribed by Brazilian mycologist Augusto Chaves Batista in 1951.

References

Fungal plant pathogens and diseases
Sordariomycetes genera
Meliolales